Oaklands, also known locally as Oaklands Castle, is a historic house on Oaklands Farm in southern Gardiner, Maine.  The main house of this farm property is a stone Gothic Revival work from the early career of the noted 19th-century architect Richard Upjohn.  It was listed on the National Register of Historic Places in 1973.

Description and history
The land was granted in the 18th century to Silvester Gardiner, one of the Kennebec Proprietors. Confiscated by the state during the American Revolutionary War (because Gardiner was a Loyalist who fled), it was recovered by Gardiner's grandson and heir, Robert Hallowell Gardiner. Gardiner developed not just the estate, but promoted the growth of the town of Gardiner, and served as its first mayor when it was incorporated. The Oaklands estate house was built in 1835–36 to a design by Richard Upjohn, then in the early stages of his illustrious career.

The Oaklands mansion house stands overlooking the Kennebec River, west of River Road and south of Cottage Road, on the larger Oaklands estate, and is accessed by dirt roads from the north and east.  The house has a two-story main block with hip roof, and a -story ell extending to its west.  It is built out of ashlar granite, and features a crenellated parapet around the roof edge, and a projecting bastion-like turret at one corner.  It was built out of stone quarried nearby in Hallowell.

See also

National Register of Historic Places listings in Kennebec County, Maine

References

Houses on the National Register of Historic Places in Maine
National Register of Historic Places in Kennebec County, Maine
Gothic Revival architecture in Maine
Houses completed in 1835
Houses in Kennebec County, Maine
Buildings and structures in Gardiner, Maine